The passenger steamer City of Columbus ran aground on Devil’s Bridge off the Gay Head Cliffs in Aquinnah, Massachusetts, in the early hours of January 18, 1884. She was owned by Boston & Savannah Steamship Company and was built in 1878 by Delaware River Iron Ship Building and Engine Works, at Chester, Pennsylvania. City of Columbus made regular runs from Boston, Massachusetts to Savannah, Georgia.

The shipwreck
On January 17, 1884 the steamer City of Columbus left Boston with a crew of 45 under the command of Captain Schuler E. Wright. Wright was very familiar with the area as he had made numerous trips through the reefs and sound of Martha's Vineyard. The captain left the City of Columbus'''s bridge in the hands of his Second Mate Edward Harding and went below to sleep. While off Martha's Vineyard at 3:45 am on January 18, the lookout yelled to the second mate that the Devil’s Bridge buoy was off the port bow rather than where it should have appeared off the starboard bow just before the ship struck a double ledge of submerged rocks. Harding ordered the Quartermaster, Roderick A. McDonald, to go port followed by Captain Wright's order to "hard port" and once again the City of Columbus smacked against the reef. Wright attempted in vain to free the ship. Attempts to use the sails only pushed the boat further into the reef.  After these attempts he decided to go over the “obstruction”. This just made things worse. The captain gathered the 87 passengers from below and was in the midst of explaining their situation when a rush of water into the cabin forced all to the top deck, where a giant wave struck the boat and swept all women and children, and many of the men, into the frozen waters.

Two lifeboats were launched from the City of Columbus only to have the ocean waves smash them against the iron sides of the ship. One actually made it to land with four survivors; the other was later found awash, with one survivor, a sea captain who was revived. Passengers and crew attempted to stay afloat in the rough seas by holding onto the rigging of the ship. Lighthouse keeper Horiatio N. Pease and a complement of Gay Head Wampanoag Indians braved the waves in  two lifeboats to save passengers that had held on. The sea was so rough that the Indians feared approaching the steamer would cause their own boat to get smashed, so they called to the men to dive off the rigging and come to the lifeboats. Most of those who attempted this were saved by the Indians.

The rescue effort was then continued when the revenue cutter Dexter, skippered by Captain Eric Gabrielson, came to their aid. The Dexter, being a smaller ship, was able to move about the wreckage and pull survivors off the rigging and masts. Two of the survivors were unconscious; Second Lieutenant John U. Rhodes saved them by tying himself to a rope and swimming to the wreck. Even after being hit with a piece of wreckage, he continued, climbing the rigging to bring the men back to safety. The City of Columbus'' had left Boston with 45 officers and crew and 87 passengers, only 17 crew members and 12 passengers survived the ordeal. This incident was reported as one of the worst ocean disasters of its time.

The shipwreck was later purchased by the Boston Towboat Company in 1886, and some parts were salvaged.

Notes
Footnotes

Citations

References cited

 
 
  
 

Steamships of the United States
Aquinnah, Massachusetts
Passenger ships of the United States
1878 ships
Ships built by the Delaware River Iron Ship Building and Engine Works
Shipwrecks of the Massachusetts coast
Martha's Vineyard
Maritime incidents in January 1884